Etiocholanediol (5β-androstanediol) may refer to:

 3α-Etiocholanediol (5β-androstane-3α,17β-diol; etiocholane-3α,17β-diol) – an endogenous intermediate to epiandrosterone
 3β-Etiocholanediol (5β-androstane-3β,17β-diol; etiocholane-3β,17β-diol) – an endogenous intermediate to epietiocholanolone

See also
 Androstanediol
 Androstenediol
 Androstanedione
 Androstenedione
 Androstanolone
 Androstenolone